Thaana, Taana or Tāna (    ) is the present writing system of the Maldivian language spoken in the Maldives. Thaana has characteristics of both an abugida (diacritics, vowel-killer strokes) and a true alphabet (all vowels are written), with consonants derived from indigenous and Arabic numerals, and vowels derived from the vowel diacritics of the Arabic abjad. Maldivian orthography in Thaana is largely phonemic.

Name
H. C. P. Bell, the first serious researcher of Maldivian documents, used the spelling Tāna, as the initial consonant is unaspirated.

History
The Thaana script first appeared in a Maldivian inscription towards the beginning of the 17th century in a crude initial form known as Gabulhi Thaana which was written scripta continua. This early script slowly developed, its characters slanting 45 degrees, becoming more graceful and adding spaces between words. As time went by it gradually replaced the older Dhives Akuru alphabet. The oldest written sample of the Thaana script is found in the island of Kanditheemu in Northern Miladhunmadulu Atoll. It is inscribed on the door posts of the main Hukuru Miskiy (Friday mosque) of the island and dates back to 1008 AH (AD 1599) and 1020 AH (AD 1611) when the roof of the building was built and then renewed during the reigns of Ibrahim Kalaafaan (Sultan Ibrahim III) and Hussain Faamuladeyri Kilege (Sultan Hussain II) respectively.

The origins of Thaana are unique among the world's writing systems: The first nine letters (h–v) are derived from the Arabic numerals, whereas the next nine (m–d) were the local Indic numerals. (See Hindu–Arabic numerals.) The remaining letters for loanwords (z–ch) and Arabic transliteration are derived from phonetically similar native consonants by means of diacritics (like nuqta), with the exception of y, which is of unknown origin. This means that Thaana is one of the few writing systems not derived graphically from the original Semitic alphabet—unless the Indic numerals were (see Brahmi numerals). (The Ogham script of Ireland is another example, which also has some relation to numbers, since most of its letters are differentiated from others in a way similar to tally marks.)

The order of the Thaana alphabet (ha, shaviyani, noonu, raa, baa, etc.) does not follow the order of other Indic scripts or of the Arabic script. There is no apparent logic to the order; this has been interpreted as suggesting that the script was scrambled to keep it secret from average islanders. The script was originally used primarily to write magical (fanḍita) incantations. These included Arabic quotations, written from right to left. Maldivian learned men, who were all well versed in sorcery, saw the advantages of writing in this simplified hidden script, and Thaana was gradually adopted for everyday use.

Thaana nearly disappeared for a brief period in recent history. Towards the mid-1970s, during President Ibrahim Nasir's reign, Telex machines were introduced by the Maldivian government in the local administration. The new telex equipment was viewed as a great progress, but Thaana was deemed to be an obstacle because messages on the telex machines could only be written in the Latin script. Following this, a rough Latin transliteration for Maldivian was officially approved by the Maldivian government in 1976 and was quickly implemented by the administration. Booklets were printed and dispatched to all Atoll and Island Offices, as well as schools and merchant liners. 

The Thaana script was reinstated by President Maumoon Abdul Gayoom shortly after he took power in 1978, although the Latin transcription of 1976 continues to be widely used.

Characteristics
Thaana, like Arabic, is written right to left. It indicates vowels with diacritic marks derived from Arabic. Each letter must carry either a vowel or a sukun (which indicates "no vowel"). The only exception to this rule is nūnu which, when written without a diacritic, indicates prenasalization of a following stop.

For a sample text, see the article on Qaumee salaam, the Maldives' national anthem.

Even though it is not part of the alphabet, Arabic ligature Allah ﷲ is used for writing names in Thaana, for example  (Abdullah). "Allah" is never written in thaana, with the ligature ﷲ used.

Consonants
The letter alifu (އ) is used for three different purposes other than acting as a normal consonant: it can act as a carrier for a vowel in the second part of a diphthong (if there is a preceding consonant with a vowel); when it carries a sukun, it indicates gemination (lengthening) of the following consonant (even if the consonant is at the beginning of another word); and if alifu+sukun occurs at the end of a word, it indicates that the word ends in a glottal stop. Gemination of nasal consonants, however, is indicated by noonu+sukun preceding the nasal to be geminated. Originally, each letter had the name "consonant+a+viyani". The suffix -viyani originated from the word viyana which came from Sanskrit व्यञ्जन vyáñjana. For example, haa was originally called haviyani. The names of consonants which had equivalent sounds in Arabic were changed to the Arabic names for the sounds (excepting gaafu, which is a Persian sound).

Naviyani
Naviyani (ޱ) represents the retroflex "n" common to many Indic languages. This letter was abolished from Maldivian official documents around 1953.

The letter's former position in the Maldivian alphabet was the sixteenth, between Gaafu and Seenu, instead of Gnaviyani (ޏ). The former position of Gnaviyani (ޏ) was 22nd. It is still seen in reprints of old books like the Bodu Tarutheebu, and it is used by the people of Addu Atoll and Fuvahmulah when writing songs or poetry in their dialects as the sound is still present in their spoken dialects.

Thikijehi Thaana
These additional letters were added to the Thaana alphabet by adding dots to existing letters, to allow for transliteration of Arabic loanwords, as previously Arabic loanwords were written using the Arabic script. Their usage is inconsistent, and becoming less frequent as the spelling changes to reflect pronunciation by Maldivians, rather than the original Arabic pronunciation, as the words get absorbed into the Maldivian language.

Vowels
The vowel strokes or diacritical signs are called fili in Maldivian; there are five fili for short vowels (a, i, u, e, o), where the first three were derived from Arabic vowel signs (fatḥah, kasrah and ḍammah). The ebefili looks similar to the Bari ye. Long vowels (aa, ee, oo, ey and oa) are denoted by doubling fili (except oa, which is a modification of the short obofili).

Unicode 

Thaana was added to the Unicode Standard in September 1999 with the release of version 3.0.

The Unicode block for Thaana is U+0780–U+07BF:

See also 
Maldivian writing systems

References

Literature 
Bell, H. C. P. The Maldive islands: Monograph on the History, Archaeology and Epigraphy. Reprint 1940 edn. Malé 1986.
Bell, H. C. P. The Maldive Islands: An account of the physical features, History, Inhabitants, Productions and Trade. Colombo, 1883, 
Bell, H. C. P. Excerpta Maldiviana. Reprint 1922-1935 edition New Delhi 1998.
Divehi Bahuge Qawaaaid. Vols 1 to 5. Ministry of Education. Malé 1978.
Divehīnge Tarika. Divehīnge Bas. Divehibahāi Tārikhah Khidumaykurā Qaumī Majlis. Malé 2000.
Romero-Frias, Xavier, The Maldive Islanders, A Study of the Popular Culture of an Ancient Ocean Kingdom. 
Geiger, Wilhelm. Maldivian Linguistic Studies. Reprint 1919 edn. Novelty Press. Malé 1986.

External links
 Profile in Omniglot
 A brief description of Thaana is available at this website
 Latin-Thaana Converter
 Thaana font selection from Dhivehi.mv
 The Unicode 5.0 Standard: 8.4 Thaana
 Unicode Character Code Charts: Thaana
 GNU FreeFont Unicode font family with Thaana range in its serif face.

Abugida writing systems
Maldivian scripts
Right-to-left writing systems
Writing systems introduced in the 17th century

fr:Divehi#Alphabet